The Gullah are African Americans who live in the Lowcountry region of the U.S. states of Georgia, Florida, South Carolina, and North Carolina, in both the coastal plain and the Sea Islands. They developed a creole language, also called Gullah, and a culture with some African influence.

Historically, the Gullah region extended from the Cape Fear area on North Carolina's coast south to the vicinity of Jacksonville on Florida's coast. The Gullah people and their language are also called Geechee, which may be derived from the name of the Ogeechee River near Savannah, Georgia. Gullah is a term that was originally used to designate the creole dialect of English spoken by Gullah and Geechee people. Over time, its speakers have used this term to formally refer to their creole language and distinctive ethnic identity as a people. The Georgia communities are distinguished by identifying as either "Freshwater Geechee" or "Saltwater Geechee", depending on whether they live on the mainland or the Sea Islands.

Because of a period of relative isolation from whites while working on large plantations in rural areas, the Africans, enslaved from a variety of Central and West African ethnic groups, developed a creole culture that has preserved much of their African linguistic and cultural heritage from various peoples; in addition, they absorbed new influences from the region. The Gullah people speak an English-based creole language containing many African loanwords and influenced by African languages in grammar and sentence structure. Sometimes referred to as "Sea Island Creole" by linguists and scholars, the Gullah language is sometimes likened to Bahamian Creole, Barbadian Creole, Guyanese Creole, Belizean Creole, Jamaican Patois and the Krio language of West Africa. Gullah crafts, farming and fishing traditions, folk beliefs, music, rice-based cuisine and story-telling traditions all exhibit strong influences from Central and West African cultures.

Over the years, the Gullah have attracted study by many historians, linguists, folklorists, and anthropologists interested in their rich cultural heritage. Many academic books on that subject have been published. The Gullah have also become a symbol of cultural pride for blacks throughout the United States and a subject of general interest in the media. Numerous newspaper and magazine articles, documentary films, and children's books on Gullah culture, have been produced, in addition to popular novels set in the Gullah region. In 1991 Julie Dash wrote and directed Daughters of the Dust, the first feature film about the Gullah, set at the turn of the 20th century on St. Helena Island. Born into a Gullah family, she was the first African-American woman director to produce a feature film.

Exhibitions

Film and television

Film

Television

Historical landmarks
 "Designated by Congress in 2006, the Gullah Geechee Cultural Heritage Corridor extends from Wilmington, North Carolina in the north to Jacksonville, Florida in the south."

Literature
As mentioned above, the characters in Joel Chandler Harris' Uncle Remus stories speak in a Deep South Gullah dialect. Other books about or which feature Gullah characters and culture are listed below.

Children's books on the Gullah

Fictional works set in the Gullah region

 Royce, Eden (2021). Root Magic. New York: HarperCollins
 
 
  Critique.

Gullah culture

Gullah history

Gullah language and storytelling

Sciences
A pseudoscorpion species (Neocheiridium gullahorum) from South Carolina was named after the Gullah people and culture.
A lichen species (Bacidia gullahgeechee) from South Carolina was named in honor of the Gullah communities in the region where the lichen grows.

Music
"Gullah" is the third song on Clutch's album Robot Hive/Exodus (2005).
"Kum Bah Yah" is a Gullah phrase, and as such, the song is claimed to have originated in Gullah culture
The folk song "Michael Row the Boat Ashore" (or "Michael Row Your Boat Ashore") comes from the Gullah culture

Photography
Historical photos of the Gullah can be found in such works as:
 
 
Millerton, Suzanna Krout. New York: Aperture, Inc.
Weems, Carrie Mae. Sea Islands Series. 1991–92.

References

Gullah culture